This is a list of seasons completed by the SMU Mustangs men's basketball team.

Season by season results

  Due to multiple violations, including academic fraud and unethical conduct, SMU was ineligible for all postseason play including the AAC Tournament and NCAA Tournament. Additionally, head coach Larry Brown was suspended for nine games.

References

SMU
SMU Mustangs basketball seasons
SMU Mustangs basketball seasons